Guilai railway station is a railway station located in Pingtung City, Pingtung County, Taiwan. It is located on the Pingtung line and is operated by Taiwan Railways.

Around the station
 National Pingtung University

References

1956 establishments in Taiwan
Railway stations opened in 1956
Railway stations in Pingtung County
Railway stations served by Taiwan Railways Administration